Holyoake Range is a mountain range in the southern section of the Churchill Mountains, extending in a northwest–southeast direction for about  between Prince Philip Glacier and Errant Glacier. 

It and the Churchill Mountains are part of the Transantarctic Mountains System.

The Holyoake Range was named by the New Zealand Antarctic Place-Names Committee for the Rt. Hon. Keith Holyoake who, first as Minister of Agriculture, then as Prime Minister, and later as Leader of the Opposition, gave strong support to New Zealand participation in the Commonwealth Trans-Antarctic Expedition of 1956–58.

Features
Geographical features include:

 Adams Bluff
 Cambrian Bluff
 Errant Glacier
 Gutenberg Glacier
 Hunt Mountain
 Mansergh Snowfield
 Melrose Peak
 Mount Richter
 Peters Peak

References

Mountain ranges of the Ross Dependency
Transantarctic Mountains
Shackleton Coast